The 33mm APX (French: Ateliers des Puteaux—"Puteaux workshops") was a series of 33 mm caliber autocannon manufactured in France during the early 1930s for use in aircraft. 

The weapon was originally designed to be fitted to the Farman F.1010, a low-wing monoplane test-bed aircraft built to trial the cannon. Constructed by Ateliers des Puteaux, the cannon were tested by the French Government in the 1930s and intended to be shot through the propellor hub of an inverted V8 aircraft engine - but were not put into large scale production. A number of prototypes and versions were constructed during the 1930s, some purchased by Greece for testing. The weapon was also fitted to the Hanriot H.115 and KEA L.33, though interest in the weapon generally dwindled. 

A number of variants were produced in the early 1930s, with differing muzzle velocity, fire rates and ammunition capacities - some designed specifically for the moteur canon (motor cannon) role. From the mid-1930s onwards, further development was conducted into following-on from the Oerlikon license produced cannons, including a new operating system to increase rate of fire, which eventually resulted in the famed H.S.404 auto cannon.

Properties 

The 1932 33mm Ateliers des Puteaux cannon fired a High-Explosive or Armour-Piercing round at 650m/s and had a fire rate of 300 rounds per minute. Overall the weapon weighed 150kg and was fed by a drum that could contain up to 35 rounds, firing rounds with up to 72g of explosive filler. The AP round was capable of penetrating up to 32 mm of armour at 500 metres. The later 1933 revision fired the same projectile at 900m/s and retained the cylic fire rate, whilst being 10kg lighter.

Variants 
Data from

Specifications (1932 33mm A.P.X. Cannon) 

 Type: single-barrel automatic cannon
 Calibre: 33 x 95 mm (1.29 in)
 Operation: recoil-operated
 Weight without drum magazine: 
 Weight (complete): 
 Rate of fire: 300 rpm
 Muzzle velocity: 
 Ammunition: AP and HE
 Projectile weight: HE: , AP: 
 HE and HEI rounds explosive filler: 
 Length: 1960 mm (77.16 in)
 Barrel Length: 700 mm (27.5 in)

References 

Autocannon
Aircraft guns